Lewis Channel is a strait located between Cortes Island and West Redonda Island in the Discovery Islands of British Columbia, Canada. It is part of the northern Salish Sea.

Geography
Lewis Channel connects Desolation Sound to the south with Calm Channel and Deer Channel to the north. Teakerne Arm branches off of the main channel to the east and forms a large protected bay within West Redonda Island. The channel itself contains no major islands.

Hydrology
The northern hydrological limit of Lewis Channel delineates part of the northern limit of the Salish Sea.

See also
Sutil Channel
Waddington Channel
Homfray Channel

References

Central Coast of British Columbia
Landforms of the Discovery Islands
Channels of British Columbia
Salish Sea